Schleese Saddlery Service Ltd. is a Canadian manufacturer of custom-fitted saddles for show-jumping and dressage. It was started in 1986 by Jochen Schleese, a German saddler, in Stouffville, Ontario. Schleese Saddles are manufactured in Asia https://www.edc.ca/en/article/schleese-saddlery-innovation-transformed-saddles.html

References

External links
 Schleese Saddlery Service, Ltd. website

Manufacturing companies of Canada
Saddle manufacturers
Manufacturing companies based in Ontario